Now Is Good is a 2012 teen romantic drama film directed by Ol Parker. Based on Jenny Downham's 2007 novel Before I Die, it was adapted by Parker, who had recently written the screenplay for The Best Exotic Marigold Hotel. The film, which stars Dakota Fanning, Jeremy Irvine and Paddy Considine, centres on Tessa, a girl who is dying of leukaemia and tries to enjoy her remaining life as much as she possibly can.

The first trailer for the film was released on 5 March 2012.

Plot
Tessa is seventeen with terminal acute lymphoblastic leukemia. Aided by her best friend Zoey, she fulfills an undisclosed bucket list before her impending death. One night, both attempt to engage in sex with two boys they pick up in a club.

Tessa goes on a radio talk show with her overbearing single father, where she pokes fun at her terminal diagnosis and approaches it with humour. Tessa is loving and caring towards her brother Cal, towards whom she feels guilty for stealing her parents' attention, and gives him days that are all about him while dealing with her father trying to treasure every moment with his daughter, while her mother is supportive, but is rarely there for her. Tessa gets the last of her chemotherapy equipment removed from her body so she can live the rest of her days normally. She meets her new neighbour Adam, who is taking care of his handicapped widowed mother while putting his own life on hold such as going to university, and Tessa instantly befriends him. Adam joins Tessa and Zoey on their adventures, where he takes care of both of them while they take hallucinogenic mushrooms before going into the forest and finding great cliffs, followed by going to a party where Tessa and Adam start developing feelings for each other. Tessa and Zoey continue to fulfil Tessa's bucket list by stealing from a store, but after being caught Tessa discovers that Zoey stole a pregnancy test, suggesting that she may be pregnant.

Tessa and Adam go to the beach together and begin a romantic relationship. Tessa introduces Adam to her father, who disapproves of the relationship because Tessa's health is currently in steep decline after she stopped chemotherapy. He tells Adam, Tessa's condition will get worse and that Adam won't be up to it. Tessa takes Zoey to a clinic where Zoey's pregnancy is confirmed, with Zoey not sure if she will keep the baby.

Tessa and Adam attempt to go on a regular date, but Tessa breaks out in a huge nose bleed that leads to her hospitalisation. Adam freezes, leaving Tessa's mother to take her to hospital. While she is hospitalised, Adam begins painting her name all over the city so when Tessa leaves the hospital she can see her name is all over the city, fulfilling one of her bucket list items that everyone will know she existed, leaving Tessa satisfied and smiling. Zoey reveals to Tessa she is keeping the baby which will be due in April. Tessa and Adam begin spending every night together so Tessa will not be alone at night anymore, even after Tessa's father refuses the request due to their age and what Tessa is going through, but he relents after Tessa reveals she is willing to take the risk despite the burden coming due to her impending death.

Tessa visits her doctor, who tells her that her cancer is causing her immune system to collapse and her life will soon end; she will not make it to April to see Zoey's baby being born. Tessa leaves to find Adam who can comfort her, but she finds out that Adam went to an orientation day for a university that he is planning on attending in the autumn. Tessa has a complete meltdown in her room and smashes it up, revealing the bucket list painted on her wall that had been hidden by a blanket. Her father comes home and sees the list, which causes him to break down because she excluded him when he wanted to spend as much time with her as possible. Tessa comforts and apologises to him. She escapes to the seaside cliffs, where Adam finds her, and they have a cathartic moment together where Tessa gives Adam her blessing to fall in love at university after her death.

Tessa's health begins to deteriorate rapidly and her nurse tells her that she will die within days. Tessa spends her last days dozing in and out of consciousness due to the drugs, while spending her last days with Adam, her father, her mother, and her brother. She has a series of daydreams where she lives a healthy happy life with Adam and her family. The daydreams are cut short with her family saying their final goodbyes to a barely conscious Tessa followed by another daydream of a healthy Tessa and Adam together on the ocean cliffs, which is followed by Tessa lying peacefully with Adam (presumably peacefully dying in Adam's arms) and one final daydream of Tessa meeting Zoey's baby with the final monologue that "life is a series of moments. Let them go. Moments all gathering toward this one" with a healthy smiling Tessa holding Zoey's new born baby girl.

Cast
 Dakota Fanning as Tessa Scott
 Jeremy Irvine as Adam
 Paddy Considine as Tessa's father
 Olivia Williams as Tessa's mother
 Edgar Canham as Cal Scott, Tessa's brother
 Kaya Scodelario as Zoey Walker, Tessa's friend
 Rose Leslie as Fiona
 Joe Cole as Scott
 Sarah Hadland as Caroline
 Patrick Baladi as Richard
 Franz Drameh as Tommy
 Susan Brown as Shirley
 Rakie Ayola as Phillipa
 Julia Ford as Sally
 Tom Kane as Paul 
 Isabella Laughland as Beth 
 Josef Altin as Jake
 Morgan Watkins as Nurse

Reception
Now Is Good received mixed reviews from critics when it was released in September 2012. The Guardian awarded it two out of five stars and said that it "never really rises above being a collection of clichés, despite some decent performances".  Empire Magazine awarded it three out of five stars and called it an "uneven but ultimately effective weepie with terrific turns from Considine and Williams, who outshine the younger cast."  The Birmingham Mail said "If you're a fan of Nicholas Sparks' films – or fancy a good old weep in the cinema – then you could do worse than see this movie." Total Film awarded it three out of five stars and said "You'll be in bits, but your critical faculties might weep too." Norwich Evening News said "The film avoids all the sentimentality and gives you moments that seem uncomfortably realistic but it doesn't lose sight of the fact, while that it is a weepie, it is still an entertainment."

Review aggregation website Rotten Tomatoes gave the film a score of 58% based on reviews from 26 critics.

References

External links
 
 
 Now Is Good at Box Office Mojo

2012 films
2012 romantic drama films
2010s coming-of-age drama films
2010s teen drama films
2010s teen romance films
British coming-of-age drama films
British romantic drama films
British teen drama films
British teen romance films
Coming-of-age romance films
2010s English-language films
Films about cancer
Films about death
Films about dysfunctional families
Films about virginity
Films based on British novels
Films based on young adult literature
Films directed by Ol Parker
Films scored by Dustin O'Halloran
Films set in Brighton
Films shot in Buckinghamshire
French coming-of-age drama films
French romantic drama films
French teen drama films
2010s British films
2010s French films